Dave Chardon (born 8 December 1951) is an Australian cricketer. He played one first-class and one List A match for New South Wales in 1975/76.

See also
 List of New South Wales representative cricketers

References

External links
 

1951 births
Living people
Australian cricketers
New South Wales cricketers
Cricketers from Sydney